The 2016 William Hill World Darts Championship was the 23rd World Championship organised by the Professional Darts Corporation since it separated from the British Darts Organisation. The event was held at the Alexandra Palace, London, between 17 December 2015 and 3 January 2016.

Gary Anderson was the defending champion, having won his first world title in the 2015 final by beating 16-times champion Phil Taylor 7–6. He retained his title by beating Adrian Lewis 7–5. He also threw a nine-dart finish in his semi-final against Jelle Klaasen to add a bonus £15,000 to his winnings, and hit two maximum checkouts of 170 in the progress.	

There were 654 maximums thrown during the event, beating the record of 625 from the previous year. 34 of these were produced in the final which is a record for a professional match.

Three-time world champion John Part was a notable absentee in this tournament, having failed to qualify for the first time since joining the PDC in 1997.

Format
The tournament featured 72 players. The top 32 players on the PDC Order of Merit on 30 November 2015 (after the Players Championship Finals) were seeded for the tournament. They were joined by the 16 highest non-qualified players from the Pro Tour Order of Merit, based on the events played on the 2015 PDC Pro Tour.

These 48 players were joined by two PDPA qualifiers (as determined at a PDPA Qualifying event held in Coventry on 30 November 2015), and 22 international players: the four highest names on the European Order of Merit not already qualified, and 18 further international qualifiers determined by the PDC and PDPA. Some of the international players, such as the four from the European Order of Merit, and the top American and Australian players entered straight into the first round, while others, having won qualifying events in their countries, were entered into the preliminary round.	

Thanawat Gaweenuntawong became the first player from Thailand to play at a World Darts Championship.

Prize money
The 2016 World Championship featured a prize fund of at least £1,500,000 – an increase of £250,000 from the 2015 tournament.

The prize money was allocated as follows:

Qualifiers

Order of Merit

Pro Tour
  Alan Norris 
  Gerwyn Price 
  Joe Murnan 
  Daryl Gurney 
  Keegan Brown 
  Max Hopp 
  Rowby-John Rodriguez 
  Christian Kist 
  Cristo Reyes 
  David Pallett 
  Ronny Huybrechts 
  Dirk van Duijvenbode 
  Jeffrey de Zwaan 
  Kyle Anderson 
  Joe Cullen 
  Darren Webster 

European Pro Tour
  
  Jan Dekker 
  Jyhan Artut 
  Jermaine Wattimena

PDPA QualifierFirst Round Qualifier
  Ricky Evans

Preliminary Round Qualifier
  Andy Boulton

International Qualifiers
First Round Qualifiers
  Koha Kokiri 
  Laurence Ryder 
  Darin Young 
Preliminary Round Qualifiers
  René Eidams 
  
  Sven Groen 
  Per Laursen 
  Paul Lim 
  Mick McGowan 
  John Michael 
  Keita Ono 
  Aleksandr Oreshkin 
  Michael Rasztovits 
  Warrick Scheffer 
  Sun Qiang 
  Rob Szabo 
  Alex Tagarao
  Kim Viljanen

Results

Preliminary round
The format in the preliminary round was extended from a best-of-seven legs to a best-of-three sets format. One match was played in the first eight sessions with the winners playing their first round matches at the end of the session.

Main draw

Final

Statistics

Representation from different countries
This table shows the number of players by country in the World Championship, the total number including the preliminary round.

Broadcasting

The tournament was available in the following countries on these channels:

† Sky Sports F1 was renamed as Sky Sports Darts for the duration of the tournament.

References

External links
Official site
Netzone, Schedule, Results

2016
World Championship
World Championship
2015 sports events in London
2016 sports events in London
December 2015 sports events in the United Kingdom
January 2016 sports events in the United Kingdom
2015 in British sport
2016 in British sport
International sports competitions in London
Alexandra Palace